Rowan Michael Brennan (born 13 April 1958), also known by the nickname of "Animal", is a Papua New Guinean professional rugby league footballer who played in the 1980s.

Background
Rowan Brennan was born in Port Moresby, Papua New Guinea.

References

External links
Statistics at rugbyleagueproject.org

1958 births
Living people
Canberra Raiders players
Expatriate rugby league players in Australia
Papua New Guinean expatriate rugby league players
Papua New Guinean expatriate sportspeople in Australia
Expatriate sportspeople in England
Papua New Guinean rugby league players
People from the National Capital District (Papua New Guinea)
Rugby league fullbacks
Rugby league second-rows
Wakefield Trinity players